Vladimir Yuryevich Kulik (born 18 February 1972) is a Russian former professional footballer.

Club career
He made his professional debut in the Soviet Second League in 1989 for FC Kirovets Leningrad.
In 2000, Arsenal and Manchester United tried to buy Vladimir Kulik's rights. Kulik had accepted Arsenal deal, however his work license was failed cause he never played for Russian national football team. He was called up to the national team once in 1997, but remained on the bench.

Post-playing career
After retirement he works as a player agent.

Honours
 Russian Premier League runner-up: 1998.
 Russian Premier League bronze: 1999.
 Russian Cup winner: 2002 (played in the early stages of the 2001/02 tournament for PFC CSKA Moscow).
 Russian Cup finalist: 2000.

European club competitions
With PFC CSKA Moscow.

 UEFA Champions League 1999–2000 qualification: 2 games.
 UEFA Cup 2000–01: 2 games.

References

1972 births
Footballers from Saint Petersburg
Living people
Soviet footballers
Soviet Union under-21 international footballers
Russian footballers
Russia under-21 international footballers
Association football forwards
FC Zenit Saint Petersburg players
Russian Premier League players
PFC CSKA Moscow players
Association football agents